The Holly Street Livery Stable is a historic livery stable located at 110 E. Holly St. in Pasadena, California. The brick building has an irregular trapezoidal shape, as it was built next to Santa Fe Railroad tracks. Built in 1904, the stable was first used by John Breiner, who ran the Pasadena City Market; Breiner used the stable for the horses and wagons needed to deliver groceries. The stable was also used during the early years of the Rose Parade as both a float construction site and a site for hitching horses to wagons. After the automobile supplanted horse-drawn vehicles, the stable has been used for a variety of other purposes, including a Red Cross thrift store, an auto repair shop, and a furniture warehouse.

The stable was added to the National Register of Historic Places on October 25, 1979.

References

External links

Agricultural buildings and structures on the National Register of Historic Places in California
Buildings and structures on the National Register of Historic Places in Pasadena, California
Buildings and structures completed in 1904
Stables in the United States
Agricultural buildings and structures on the National Register of Historic Places
1904 establishments in California